WTIM (870 AM) is a radio station licensed to Assumption, Illinois, United States. The station broadcasts a news-talk format, and is currently owned by Randal Miller through licensee Kaskaskia Broadcasting, Inc. WTIM is also heard in Taylorville, Illinois through a translator on 96.1 FM.

WWL in New Orleans is the dominant Class A station on 870 AM. WTIM must leave the air from sunset to sunrise to protect the nighttime Skywave signal of WWL.

References

External links

TIM
News and talk radio stations in the United States
Radio stations established in 1972
1972 establishments in Illinois
TIM